Ram Bagh may refer to the following places:

Aram Bagh, Karachi, locality in Karachi, Sindh, Pakistan, formerly and colloquially called Ram Bagh
Ram Bagh, Amritsar, garden and palace in Amritsar, Punjab, India
Rambagh, Allahabad, locality in Allahabad, Uttar Pradesh, India
Rambagh Palace, Jaipur, palace turned hotel in Jaipur, Rajasthan, India